The Conjugal Dictatorship of Ferdinand and Imelda Marcos is a 1976 memoir written by press censor and propagandist Primitivo Mijares. It details the inner workings of Philippine martial law under Ferdinand Marcos from the perspective of Mijares.

The book's use of the term "conjugal dictatorship" has since been used to denote the rule of Philippine president and dictator Ferdinand Marcos and his wife Imelda Marcos, and is also used to describe a type of familial dictatorship.

Background and conception 
A journalist who had become a propagandist and confidant for Ferdinand Marcos, Primitivo Mijares had served under Marcos since 1963 and claimed to have been privy to government's high-level doings. As Chairman of the National Press Club, Mijares ran the Media Advisory Council, a state agency established to censor the press in 1973. Upon the declaration of martial law in September 1972, and with the power to choose which media outlet would be re-opened, the Mijares-led Media Advisory Council was accused of abusing its role and was criticized as a "money-raising tool," leading one of its members, Emil Jurado, to resign. Mijares himself, after failing to account for NPC funds, ran away to the US, and joined Manglapus' Movement for a Free Philippines and wrote the book. Mijares said that he was offered a bribe amounting to US$100,000 to be dissuaded to testify about the human rights situation in the Philippines, and said that he refused the bribe. However, whether there was a bribe by Marcos' associates or whether Mijares himself extorted money from Marcos, and whether Mijares actually received money from Marcos remains unclear. Steve Psinakis, an anti-Marcos critic married into the Lopez family that owns ABS-CBN, wrote in his memoir "A Country Not Even His Own" (2008): "The investigation (referring to the U.S. Justice Department investigation) revealed that after his February 1975 defection, Mijares did, in fact extort money from Marcos by feeding him imaginary information for which Marcos was ignorant enough to pay considerable sums. While Mijares was still receiving money from Marcos, he was at the same time lambasting Marcos in the U.S. press, causing the Marcos regime irreparable damage. It is no wonder the only natural conclusion is that Marcos had his vengeance and did Mijares in."

A declassified U.S. Department of State cable dated February 24, 1975 further casts doubt on Mijares credibility, noting that "Mijares' moved not surprising to Manila Community which recognizes him as complete opportunist who recently was feeling hot breath of Martial Law Regime for certain recent extra-curricular activities. Allegedly, Mijares gambled away 50,000 dollars of GOP funds during a 1974 Las Vegas visit, misappropriated for personal use 7,000 dollars of the First Lady's personal funds and attempted to rape a well connected Philippine foreign service secretary while in New York for the trade center opening," and that "final push to action may in fact have been provided by Philippine opposition group in US and financial inducements of Lopez family members. Local Lopezes got word of San Francisco story February 21 and quickly began telephoning glad news around town."

Attempts to refute some of the book's claims have arisen after more than a decade since its publication. For example, the book insinuated that Marcos plotted the Plaza Miranda bombing to wipe out the entire Liberal Party leadership and that the weapon landing from China for the communists along the coast of Isabela was 'staged'. In 1989, four unnamed "former ranking Party officials" admitted to the plot to bomb Plaza Miranda,  and former NPA Victor Corpus admitted that their plot was foiled when the weapons that they were about to receive from communist China was intercepted by the military. However, no official statement from the Communist Party of the Philippines exists taking credit for the Plaza Miranda bombing.

Online release and revised edition reprint 
In May 2016, the heirs of Primitivo Mijares released The Conjugal Dictatorship as a free e-book download from the Ateneo de Manila Rizal Library.

In February 2017, a revised and annotated reprint of the book was released by Mijares' grandson Joseph Christopher Mijares Gurango. The Mijares family admitted that what happened to Primitivo and his youngest son Boyet was so traumatic that they did not want to talk about it, but decided to break their silence with the resurgence of Marcos in the political scene, culminated by the burial of Marcos in the Libingan ng mga Bayani and near victory of the dictator's namesake and son, Ferdinand Jr., in the 2016 national elections. The revised edition was aimed for the "new generation of readers", referring to the millennials, as well as new annotations and "verification of sources".

Usage of the term 
The phrase alludes to the power held by both halves of the couple, especially Imelda, who began to wield much more influence than that of the typical First Lady. Imelda was able to hold many more positions in government than any other First Lady of the Philippines before her. These appointments allowed her to build structures in and around the capital of Manila and act as a de facto diplomat who traveled the world and met state leaders.

Supporters, loyalists and even propagandists of the Marcos regime criticize the use of the term because they believe that the era of the Marcos' and Martial Law was the "golden age" of the Philippines. The children of the Marcos couple: Imee, Bongbong, and Irene, reject the use of the term to describe their parents which they believe is an insult to their legacy. Meanwhile, opponents of the Marcos dictatorship use the word to highlight the excesses of the couple and the greed and plundering that occurred during their 20-year rule. Critics, such as the relatives of the desaparecidos, also use the term to describe human rights abuses by the regime during their rule together.

References

External links
 The Conjugal Dictatorship e-book from the Ateneo de Manila University Rizal Library 

Dictatorship
Imelda Marcos
Presidency of Ferdinand Marcos